Cornel Porumb (11 May 1939 – 2007) was a Romanian high jumper who competed in the 1960 Summer Olympics. He was born in Sibiu.

References

1939 births
2007 deaths
Sportspeople from Sibiu
Romanian male high jumpers
Olympic athletes of Romania
Athletes (track and field) at the 1960 Summer Olympics
Universiade medalists in athletics (track and field)
Universiade gold medalists for Romania
Medalists at the 1959 Summer Universiade